The Falaises d'Entrecasteaux (in English the Cliffs of Entrecasteaux, named after 18th century French navigator Bruni d'Entrecasteaux) comprise the cliffs, which reach heights of over 700 m, along the west coast of Amsterdam Island, a small French territory in the southern Indian Ocean.

Important Bird Area
The western coastline of the island, including the cliffs, has been identified as a 360 ha Important Bird Area (IBA) by BirdLife International because it is home to one of the largest colonies of Indian yellow-nosed albatrosses in the world, with about 19,000 pairs constituting some 20% of the world population, and about 240 pairs of sooty albatrosses.  There is also a large colony of northern rockhopper penguins, with 25,000 pairs.  Two species, grey and soft-plumaged petrels, which have become rare on the island due to predation by rats and cats, are thought to breed in the IBA.  There is a large rookery of subantarctic fur seals in the IBA.  Ten endemic arthropods have been recorded.

The vegetation, which includes three endemic plant species, is dominated by tussock-grasses and rushes which are densest towards the foot of the cliffs.  Because of the inaccessibility of the cliffs, the vegetation of the cliff-ledges was never grazed by the feral cattle that used to inhabit the island.

References

Île Amsterdam
Cliffs of France
Important Bird Areas of Île Amsterdam
Landforms of the French Southern and Antarctic Lands
Seabird colonies